Zingers is a snack cake produced and sold by Dolly Madison and Hostess, snack food brands owned by Hostess Brands.

Product line

Zingers come in chocolate, vanilla, and raspberry flavors.
 
Chocolate and vanilla Zingers have a thick layer of icing on top with creamy non-dairy filling in the middle.
Raspberry Zingers do not have icing on top but are instead covered in a mixture of shaved coconut and raspberry flavored syrup.

Marketing
A series of commercials for Zingers used the Peanuts characters, with Snoopy playing the part of the mysterious "Zinger Zapper".

Zingers later introduced the Ecto-Cooler flavor in conjunction with the release of The Real Ghostbusters cartoon series. It featured a vanilla filling topped with a thick orange flavor icing. The entire cake was colored green to match the character Slimer from the series.

In 1989, Zingers released a Teenage Mutant Ninja Turtles variety of the snack cake. The inside cream was green, to represent the Mutagen Ooze from the series, and had the characters Splinter, Krang, and the four Turtles on the wrappers. The cakes were in production until 1995, for Hostess lost the rights to the Teenage Mutant Ninja Turtles later that same year.

Hostess released a limited edition One Piece Zingers flavor in Japan around 2000, when the anime series was starting to become popular. The snack cake had a purple filling to represent the Devil Fruit from the series. The wrappers included images of the characters Monkey D. Luffy, Roronoa Zoro, and Sanji. They were in production until 2002.

References

External links

 Hostess Brands website

American desserts
American snack foods
Brand name snack foods
Hostess Brands brands